Girls Gone Wild was a 1929 pre-Code American melodrama film produced and released by Fox Film Corporation. The film was controversial as an early example of the rising tide of violence and disrespect for the law that would become key themes in the 1930s.

Cast
 Sue Carol – Babs Holworthy
 Nick Stuart – Buck Brown
 William Russell – Dan Brown
 Roy D'Arcy – Tony Morelli
 Leslie Fenton – Boogs
 Hedda Hopper – Mrs. Holworthy
 John Darrow – Speed Wade
 Matthew Betz – Augie Stern
 Edmund Breese – Judge Elliott
 Minna Redman – Grandma (*Minna Ferry)
 Louis Natheaux – Dilly
 Lumsden Hare – Tom Holworthy
 Fred MacMurray – Extra (Uncredited)

Preservation status
 The film is considered lost.

Release
Directed by Lewis Seiler, the film was released in sound and silent versions. The film starred Nick Stuart and Sue Carol, an up-and-coming young film duo being molded by Fox in the Janet Gaynor/Charles Farrell tradition.  The two would be married later in the year, in November, in a surprise ceremony.

References

External links
 
 
 Film poster
 Film still

1929 films
1929 drama films
Fox Film films
American drama films
American black-and-white films
Films directed by Lewis Seiler
Lost American films
Transitional sound drama films
Films produced by William Fox
Melodrama films
1929 lost films
Lost drama films
1920s American films